BOA Editions, Ltd. is an American independent, non-profit literary publishing company located in Rochester, New York, founded in 1976 by the late poet, editor and translator, A. Poulin, Jr., and publishing poetry, fiction, and nonfiction.

The press's mission statement: "BOA Editions, Ltd., a not-for-profit publisher of poetry and other literary works, fosters readership and appreciation of contemporary literature. By identifying, cultivating, and publishing both new and established poets and selecting authors of unique literary talent, BOA brings high quality literature to the public."

Notable authors include Li-Young Lee, Lucille Clifton, W.D. Snodgrass, Naomi Shihab Nye, Brigit Pegeen Kelly, G.C. Waldrep, Katy Lederer, Carolyn Kizer, Russell Edson, Karen Volkman, Sean Thomas Dougherty, Kazim Ali, Deena Linett, Michael Waters (writer), and Wyn Cooper. Authors have been recipients of the Pulitzer Prize, the National Book Award, Ruth Lilly Poetry Prize, Lannan Literary Awards, the Shelley Memorial Award, Guggenheim Fellowships, NEA fellowships, and many other awards and honors. BOA Editions titles have been reviewed in The New York Times,<ref>[https://www.nytimes.com/2006/09/03/books/review/Leithauser.t.html?_r=1 The New York Times Sunday Book Review > The Peaks of Occult, Calm Passion By Brad Leithauser > September 3, 2006 Review of Not for Specialists: New & Selected Poems > By W.D. Snodgrass]</ref> Publishers Weekly, Library Journal, and other venues.

According to the University of Rochester, “BOA itself won the 2001 New York State Governor's Arts Award for overall artistic excellence, the only New York State not-for-profit literary publisher in 38 years ever to receive such an honor. The University of Rochester’s Rare Books and Special Collections Library owns the BOA archives from 1996-2005, and Yale University's Beinecke Library, the first collection of BOA archives, from 1976-1995. The press was featured in Publishers Weekly on the occasion of their 35th anniversary, featured by the Poetry Society of America on their 40th anniversary, and one of their titles, Not for Specialists: New and Selected Poems,'' by W. D. Snodgrass, landed on The New York Times Bestseller list

The press has received grants from Literature Program of the New York State Council on the Arts; the Literature Program of the National Endowment for the Arts; the Sonia Raiziss Giop Charitable Foundation; the Lannan Foundation; the Mary S. Mulligan Charitable Trust; the County of Monroe, NY; the Rochester Area Community Foundation; the Ames-Amzalak Memorial Trust in memory of Henry Ames, Semon Amzalak and Dan Amzalak; and the Steeple-Jack Fund.

Awards given by BOA Editions include the A. Poulin, Jr. Prize, for a poet's first collection of poetry and the Isabella Gardner Poetry Award.

References

Sources
 BOA Editions, Ltd. > About BOA
 Academy of American Poets > National Poetry Month Sponsors > BOA Editions

External links
Poetry Society of America | Features | Interviews Interview with Peter Conners  by Tony Leuzzi
 Poets & Writers Directory Listing: BOA Editions, Ltd.
 Council of Literary Magazines and Small Presses > Directory of Member Publishers
 Consortium Book Sales & Distribution > BOA Editions, Ltd. Publisher Page
 BOA Editions, Ltd. Website > Homepage
 BOA Editions, Ltd. > Videos: BOA Author Readings
 University of Rochester: News > University of Rochester Acquires Recent Archive of BOA Editions > August 23, 2005
 Poets & Writers > Small Press Points > By Kevin Larimer > May 1, 2006
 A. Poulin Papers and BOA Editions Records. Yale Collection of American Literature, Beinecke Rare Book and Manuscript Library.

Book publishing companies based in New York (state)
Culture of Rochester, New York
Non-profit organizations based in New York (state)
Publishing companies established in 1976
1976 establishments in New York (state)
Non-profit publishers